The Hunting Point–Ballston Line, designated as Route 10B, is a daily bus route operated by the Washington Metropolitan Area Transit Authority between Hunting Point and Ballston–MU station of the Orange and Silver lines of the Washington Metro. This line provides service within the neighborhoods in Fairfax County, Alexandria, and Arlington County. Alongside the neighborhoods, it also brings service through the marketplace, businesses, and offices within the counties.

Route description and service

The 10B operates from Four Mile Run Division 7 days a week. The 10B operates between Hunting Point and Ballston station via Mount Vernon Avenue, Washington Street, Walter Reed Drive, and Glebe Road. The 10B runs through the neighborhoods in the City of Alexandria, such as Arlandia and Old Town, within Mount Vernon Avenue. The 10B also runs through the neighborhoods in Arlington County, such as Ballston, Buckingham, Arlington Heights, Shirlington, and Avalon Bay. Within the neighborhoods, the 10B runs through marketplaces, businesses and offices in the City of Alexandria and Arlington County.

History

The Hunting Point–Ballston Line was introduced in 2001, during the simplification of the 10 line. The 10B was once originally part of the Alexandria–Arlington–Pentagon Line (now Alexandria–Pentagon Line) with other routes from the 10 line, until the line splits into two lines in the 1990s.

Alexandria–Arlington Line

The 10B started its service as part of the Alexandria–Arlington Line, alongside service of the 10C and the 10D following the split with routes 10A and 10E in the 1990s. From the split, the 10B operated from Virginia Hospital Center in Arlington Virginia to Hunting Towers, with select trips operating up to Old Town Alexandria near Braddock Road Station. The 10C operates between East Falls Church Station and Hunting Towers, while the 10D operates on the same interval, with the extension to Seven Corners Center. The 10C operates during weekdays, while the 10D operates only on Saturdays. The 10C and 10D was discontinued on December 30, 2001 and replaced by Arlington Transit routes 51 and 52. Following these changes, the line was renamed to Hunting Towers–Ballston Line until 2012, when the line is renamed to Hunting Point–Ballston Line.

December 2001 changes

On December 30, 2001, the 10B was rerouted to operate via Arna Valley (now Avalon Bay) and Shirley Park. This brings in more service at Shirley Park, where the 10B can connect to routes 22A, 22B, 22C, and 22F of the Walker Chapel–Pentagon Line. Service on South Glebe Road between West Glebe Road and Arlington Ridge Road is provided by routes 23A and 23C of the McLean–Crystal City Line.

2013 Proposed Changes

In 2013, WMATA proposed two options to the 10B.

The first option was to discontinue the Arlington Heights portion of the 10B, and reroute to operate via South Glebe Road. The 10B would also discontinue service at the neighborhood of Nauck, and operate via Douglas Park on Walter Reed Drive, and serve Arlington Mill Drive before heading to Shirlington Bus Station. The 10B will also further modify its service, by eliminating service at Parkfairfax to operate via Interstate 395 and South Glebe Road, leading to discontinue residential service to Arna Valley.
The second option was similar as the first option, although the 10B will continue to provide service on the neighborhoods of Nauck and Parkfairfax. On this option, only service at Arlington Heights and Arna Valley is proposed to be discontinued.

Outside of the changes of the 10B, WMATA is also proposing to add a new MetroExtra route, the 10X, to operate alongside the 10B. The new 10X will operate on limited stop, bring faster service from the 10B during peak-hours. Unlike the 10B, the 10X will not operate via the neighborhood of Nauck, Shirlington, Mount Vernon Avenue and Braddock Road station, however, it brings in service via Jefferson Davis Highway (now Richmond Highway).

The reason why WMATA planned these changes was to make the 10B reliable, and to reduce travel times travel towards Ballston–MU station. The 10X would make the line more reliable, when there is faster service on Glebe Road.

March 2014 changes

On March 30, 2014, the 10B was rerouted back to South Glebe Road, where it originally operated before December 30, 2001. Service to Arna Valley is provided by Arlington Transit route 87. These changes also occurred to reduce redundancy with ART 87.

June 2016 changes

On June 26, 2016, all late night short 10B trips was converted to full route trips to adjust travel times of the route. The 10B will no longer end at Washington Street and Pendleton Street on late nights, and will continue to operate until Hunting point.

December 2018 changes

Due to the West Glebe Road bridge construction, service will be rerouted through Interstate 395 on December 30, 2018. Route 10B no longer operates through Parkfairfax.

References

10B